This is the list of all regular-season and playoff results of the Ottawa Senators (1992–present) ice hockey club of the National Hockey League. Individual NHL and team season articles can be accessed by links under the 'Season' and 'Team' columns of the table. The team has qualified for the Stanley Cup playoffs 16 times and has not yet won a championship.

The Senators were granted a franchise in 1990. The team participated in the 1992 Expansion Draft and the 1992 NHL Entry Draft and began play in the 1992–93 season. Until 1996, the Senators played out of the Ottawa Civic Centre. In 1996, the Senators opened the new Palladium, since renamed the Corel Centre, Scotiabank Place and Canadian Tire Centre. The team finished last overall in the league during its first four seasons. After a turnover in management and head coach, the Senators qualified for the first time for the Stanley Cup playoffs in 1997. 

The Senators won the President's Trophy in the 2002–03 season for placing first in the league overall during the regular season. The team was defeated in the Eastern Conference Final. During the 2004–05 NHL season, the team operated its affiliated teams and office, but the team itself did not play due to the lockout. The team advanced to the Stanley Cup Final in the 2006–07 season but lost in five games. In 2016–17, the Senators advanced to the Eastern Conference Final again, but lost in the seventh game in double overtime.

Table key

Year by year

The season was shortened to 48 games because of the 1994–95 NHL lockout.
Beginning with the 1999–2000 season, teams received one point for losing a regular-season game in overtime.
The season was cancelled because of the 2004–05 NHL lockout.
Prior to the 2005–06 season, the NHL instituted a penalty shootout for regular-season games that remained tied after a five-minute overtime period, which prevented ties.
The season was shortened to 48 games because of the 2012–13 NHL lockout.
The season was suspended on March 12, 2020 because of the COVID-19 pandemic.
Due to the COVID-19 pandemic, the 2020–21 NHL season was shortened to 56 games.

All-time records

See also
 List of Ottawa Senators (original) seasons

References

 
Ottawa Senators
seasons